Sugar Grove is an unincorporated community in Harrison County, Indiana, in the United States.

History
A post office was established as Sugargrove in 1899, and closed two years later, in 1901.

References

Unincorporated communities in Harrison County, Indiana
Unincorporated communities in Indiana